Pongch'ŏn station is a railway station in Pongch'ŏn-dong, Kaech'ŏn municipal city, South P'yŏngan province, North Korea on the Manp'o Line of the Korean State Railway; it is also the starting point of the Pongch'ŏn Colliery Line to Pongch'ŏn Colliery.

History

The station was opened on 15 October 1933 by the Chosen Government Railway, along with the rest of the third section of the Manp'o Line from Kaech'ŏn to Kujang.

References

Railway stations in North Korea